Joypurhat Stadium is situated at Master Para, Joypurhat, Bangladesh.

See also
 Stadiums in Bangladesh
 List of cricket grounds in Bangladesh

References

Football venues in Bangladesh